Heterobathmia is a genus of Lepidoptera. It is the only genus in the suborder Heterobathmiina, as well as in the superfamily Heterobathmioidea and in the family Heterobathmiidae. Primitive, day-flying, metallic moths confined to southern South America, the adults eat the pollen of Nothofagus or southern beech and the larvae mine the leaves (Kristensen, 1983, 1999). Most known species are undescribed (but see Kristensen and Nielsen, 1978, 1998).

References 

 
 Kristensen, N.P. (1999). The non-Glossatan Moths. Ch. 4, pp. 41–49  in Kristensen, N.P. (Ed.). Lepidoptera, Moths and Butterflies. Volume 1: Evolution, Systematics, and Biogeography. Handbuch der Zoologie. Eine Naturgeschichte der Stämme des Tierreiches / Handbook of Zoology. A Natural History of the phyla of the Animal Kingdom. Band / Volume IV Arthropoda: Insecta Teilband / Part 35: 491 pp. Walter de Gruyter, Berlin, New York.
 Kristensen, N. P. and Nielsen, E.S. (1979). A new subfamily of micropterigid moths from South America. A contribution to the morphology and phylogeny of the Micropterigidae, with a generic catalogue of the family (Lepidoptera: Zeugloptera). Steenstrupia, 5(7):69-147.
 Kristensen, N. P. and Nielsen, E.S. (1998). Heterobathmia valvifer n.sp.: a moth with large apparent 'ovipositor valves' (Lepidoptera, Heterobathmiidae). Steenstrupia, 24: 141–156.

External links

 Tree of Life
 
 pdf Mouthparts
 pdf Phylogeny

Moth genera
Heterobathmiina
Taxa named by Ebbe Nielsen